Empress Li (personal name unknown) was an empress of the Di-led Chinese Cheng Han dynasty. Her husband was Li Shi, the last emperor of Cheng Han.  She was his wife when he was crown prince under his father Li Shou (Emperor Zhaowen), and when he succeeded his father in 343, he created her empress. Nothing further is known about her, including whether she survived to or survived Cheng Han's destruction by Eastern Jin forces in 347. If she did, since her husband was created the Marquess of Guiyi, she would have carried the title of marchioness.

References 

|-

Cheng Han empresses